Strand was an island on the west coast of Nordfriesland in Schleswig, which was a fiefdom of the Danish crown. The area now belongs to Schleswig-Holstein in northern Germany.

Coastlines along the Dutch-German-Danish coasts were significantly changed during and by a huge storm tide, the Saint Marcellus' flood – also referred to as the Grote Mandrenke – that occurred on 16 January 1362. Many villages and towns were lost. The outlines of Strand changed significantly, nowadays legendary Rungholt reportedly being amongst the now sunken places. The island of Südfall was separated from the mainland.

In 1634 the Burchardi flood finally split Strand island into Nordstrand, Pellworm and Nordstrandischmoor.

References

External links
Google Earth map of the area now

North Frisian Islands
Former islands of Denmark